Hurricane Fausto was a long-lived tropical cyclone that formed during the 2002 Pacific hurricane season, and later regenerated at an unusually high latitude over the north-central Pacific Ocean. Fausto was the eighth tropical cyclone, sixth named storm, fourth hurricane, and third major hurricane of the annual season. The storm developed on August 21 from a tropical wave that had crossed the Atlantic, and entered the Pacific on August 17. Becoming a tropical depression, the system intensified, and quickly became Tropical Storm Fausto early on August 22. Fausto rapidly intensified, and was already a hurricane on that same day as becoming a tropical storm. Rapid intensification continued, and the tropical cyclone ultimately peaked as a strong Category 4 hurricane on the Saffir–Simpson hurricane scale. At that time, the winds . Fausto began to gradually weaken after attaining peak intensity on August 24, and was eventually downgraded to a tropical storm two days later. Weakening continued, and Fausto degenerated into a remnant low on August 28 while well northeast of Hawaii.

Passing north of the Hawaiian Islands, the remnants of the hurricane later began to revive, and had re-developed into a tropical depression on August 30. Additional re-intensification was not significant, although Fausto managed to become a tropical storm again on September 1. Remaining a minimal tropical storm, no further intensification occurred, and by September 3, Fausto was absorbed by a frontal system.

Origins

The origins of Hurricane Fausto were from a tropical wave that emerged into the eastern Atlantic Ocean from the west coast of Africa on August 11. It crossed the Atlantic and Caribbean uneventfully. The tropical wave ultimately entered the Eastern Pacific Basin on August 17. Rapidly organizing, the system was classified using the Dvorak technique at 1800 UTC on August 18. Although a broad closed circulation was present on August 19, the system became less organized and thus was not immediately classified as a tropical depression.

Over the next two days, however, the system became much more organized. Although no further strengthening initially occurred, Fausto began to intensify after a burst in convection early on August 22. Rapid deepening began to occur thereafter, and the NHC noted that Fausto exhibited a classic-type banding feature and also noted that the outflow was increasing. The large size and widespread convection closely resembled a system that would become a major hurricane, Category 3 or higher on the Saffir–Simpson hurricane scale. The associated banding features began to wrap completely around the system, and evidence of a developing eye was seen via weather satellite.

Intensification and peak intensity

Although the eye feature became obscured and banding features appeared to be dissipating six hours after becoming a hurricane, the NHC predicted rapid intensification. Based on this, Hurricane Fausto had intensified into a Category 3 on the Saffir–Simpson hurricane scale.

The hurricane continued to intensify, although the NHC anticipated strengthening to cease, because the hurricane was expected to move into areas of colder sea surface temperatures. During this period, the winds of the system increased and Fausto became a Category 4 hurricane.

Weakening and re-development

Deep convection around the eyewall began to diminish, and Fausto then weakened to a Category 3 hurricane. After quickly dropping in strength to a Category 2 hurricane, Fausto weakened at nearly the same rate as it had intensified. Although Fausto held steady as a Category 2 hurricane for 18 hours, it then began to rapidly weaken back into a Category 1 hurricane, then a tropical storm six hours later early on August 26. Upon weakening into a tropical storm, Forecaster Miles Lawrence at NHC noted "...there is no longer any deep convection associated with its circulation...", although Fausto still remained a tropical cyclone. On August 27, the NHC issued its final advisory on Fausto, although not for dissipation, but rather that the storm crossed 140˚W, and had entered the area of responsibility for the Central Pacific Hurricane Center (CPHC). While post-storm analysis from the CPHC indicated that Fausto was a tropical storm upon emerging into the CPHC's area of responsibility (AOR), the storm was operationally classified as a tropical depression upon entering the AOR. With no deep convection remaining, the CPHC downgraded Fausto into a tropical depression at 0000 UTC August 28.

Although Fausto headed generally northwest while a tropical cyclone, it curved west-northwest after degenerating into a remnant low. Passing several hundred miles north of Hawaii, deep convection began to re-develop as the remnants of Fausto interacted with a tropical upper tropospheric trough. No further re-intensification occurred for almost 48 hours, and then Fausto became a tropical storm again at 1800 UTC September 1. Although sea surface temperature anomalies are usually attributed to the development of an El Niño, the El Niño had no effect with atmospheric conditions. A mid-latitude cyclone approached Tropical Storm Fausto and caused the system to accelerate northward. The mid-latitude cyclone eventually absorbed Fausto, and the combined system reached the Aleutian Islands of Alaska shortly thereafter.

Hurricane Fausto's regeneration north of Hawaii was unusual but not unprecedented. The other time this happened since 1966 was in the 1975 season. That time, another TUTT absorbed the remnant of Hurricane Ilsa, which led to the formation of an unnamed hurricane at high latitude. Other tropical cyclones have strengthened north of Hawaii, but the actual formation of one is rare.

Impact
Fausto did not have any effect on land, and only one ship named Jo Lonn reported minimal gales on August 24, and again the next day. No reports of damage or casualties were attributed to Fausto. The mid-latitude cyclone that absorbed Fausto passed over the Aleutian Islands. Impact from the remnants of Fausto in the Aleutian Islands or mainland Alaska is unknown.

See also

 Other tropical cyclones named Fausto
 List of Category 4 Pacific hurricanes

References

2002 in Alaska
Fausto
Fausto (2002)
Fausto (2002)
Fausto